Bazar-e Taleh is a village in Baghlan Province in north eastern Afghanistan.

Climate 
Bazar-e Taleh has a humid continental climate (Köppen climate classification: Dsb) with warm summers and cold winters.
 (Precipitation & Humidity)

See also 
 Baghlan Province

References

External links
 Satellite map at Maplandia.com

Populated places in Baghlan Province